Mount Corbató is a peak,  high, located  east of Mount Fairweather in the Duncan Mountains. The peak was geologically mapped on January 13, 1975 by the Ohio State University field party of the United States Antarctic Research Program, and named by the Advisory Committee on Antarctic Names for Charles E. Corbató, a geologist with the party.

References 

Mountains of the Ross Dependency
Amundsen Coast